Trader Captains and Merchant Princes is a 1983 role-playing game supplement for Star Trek: The Role Playing Game published by FASA.

Contents
Trader Captains and Merchant Princes enables player characters to be independent merchants plying the starlanes of the Federation in search of trade, wealth and adventure.

Reception
William A. Barton reviewed Trader Captains and Merchant Princes in Space Gamer No. 69. Barton commented that "Overall, Trader Captains and Merchant Princes is an excellent expansion to an outstanding game. if you already play ST:RPG, you should pick it up. If not, take a look – it might help convince you to switch."

Reviews
Different Worlds #43 (July/Aug., 1986)

References

Role-playing game supplements introduced in 1983
Star Trek: The Role Playing Game supplements